Prairie Township is one of fifteen townships in Edgar County, Illinois, USA.  As of the 2010 census, its population was 273 and it contained 125 housing units.

Geography

Unincorporated towns
 Scottland
 Raven

Extinct towns
 Illiana
 Quaker

Cemeteries
 Wesley Chapel Cemetery.

Major highways
  US Route 36
  US Route 150
  Illinois Route 1

Airports and landing strips
 Rowe Airport

Demographics

School districts
 Edgar County Community Unit District 6
 Georgetown-Ridge Farm Consolidated Unit School District 4

Political districts
 Illinois's 15th congressional district
 State House District 109
 State Senate District 55

References
 
 US Census Bureau 2007 TIGER/Line Shapefiles
 US National Atlas

External links
 City-Data.com
 Illinois State Archives

Townships in Edgar County, Illinois
Townships in Illinois